Holdorf is a municipality in the district of Vechta, in Lower Saxony, Germany. It is situated approximately 20 km southwest of Vechta, and 35 km north of Osnabrück. It is the native homeland of the Holdorf clan, who have since settled in Denmark.

References

External links
 

Vechta (district)